Wim Heldens (born 29 March 1954) is a Dutch realist painter, born in Sittard.

Biography

Early life

Wim Heldens was born in Sittard in the catholic south of the Netherlands. Heldens grew up in a household where from a young age he was artistically influenced by his parents and surrounded by paintings, books on art and music. His parents were not comfortable with the idea of their own son pursuing an artistic career.
The friendship with the son of a local artist, Alphons Winters, brought Heldens in contact with the local artistic community. Winters and his family lived in a large house filled with paintings, sculptures and art objects from artists like Charles Eyck, Hans Truijen and Jan Sluyters, many of whom would pay visits on a regular basis. This artistic environment had a great influence on the young artist. It was the painter Tine Wesseling (the wife of poet Bertus Aafjes) who first recognized his talent, her encouragement (and an oil-paint-kit his parents gave him for his 17th birthday) definitively set him on his course to become a painter. He experimented in oil paint with every possible painting style he had been exposed to, discovering around the age of 18 that painting the human figure in a realistic way was his true calling.

Amsterdam
In 1972, at the age of 18, Wim Heldens moved to Amsterdam. In the following years he applied to various art academies in the Netherlands, but was never accepted. He tried once more at the academy in Frankfurt where he was immediately accepted, but he decided to go his own way. In the following years he concentrated intensely on painting, locking himself up in his studio, working in isolation on improving his skills. Various trips to Italy were a great stimulation; the greatest impression from these years was the psychologically dramatic work of Caravaggio. Making a living from portrait commissions, Heldens developed this genre as a means to explore the human condition. While around him the modernist revolution was gradually being accepted as a general norm, Heldens explored renaissance techniques and three- and two-dimensional form, including abstract structural patterns. Also, the treatment of light by masters of Dutch 17C painting like Johannes Vermeer, Gerard Ter Borch and Nicolaes Maes held his fascination.

New York

By 1990, Heldens started feeling restricted in the small Dutch art community and at the end of that year he went to New York City where he found a different artistic climate with a more positive appreciation for his work, in contrast to the general feedback he received in the Netherlands, where only appreciation for his painting skills came his way. In contrast, Americans were genuinely intrigued by the psychological and the narrative qualities of Heldens’ work.

New York City became his major focus and he tried to spend as much time there as he possibly could, blending in the American artistic community, where he met American artists like Jack Beal and Charles Bell. He painted various portraits in commission, among others for the collector Raymond Saroff, who possesses an impressive collection of American native art.

Amsterdam and London

Heldens had never seriously considered his legal status as a visitor in the US and in July 1995, when he was returning once more to NYC, he was arrested at JFK Airport for having violated the visa waiver program of U.S. Immigration and he was forced back to Amsterdam.

On returning to Amsterdam, Heldens began to focus on London and in 1998 his painting “Blue Hair & Braces” was selected for the annual exhibition of The Royal Society of Portrait Painters at The Mall Galleries in London, winning the Menena Joy Schwab Award; that summer the painting was on show in The National Portrait Gallery. The painting was later purchased by the Arnot Art Museum in Elmira NY for their permanent collection. Around that time he decided to move away from portrait commissions to be able to concentrate upon a more versatile expression of human drama in contemporary life and began to submit his paintings successfully to various art competitions in London, Spain and Italy. His paintings began to find their way into private collections in the Netherlands, United Kingdom, Germany and the United States, and into collections of the Academic Hospital and the ING Bank in Amsterdam, the Bank Nederlandse Gemeenten in The Hague and the City Council in Sittard.

Wim Heldens divides his time between Amsterdam and the United States where he keeps a studio with his partner Eric who has been the leading character in most of his narrative paintings since 2004. In recent years he has been experimenting to integrate narrative elements in portraits, finding creative ways to paint portraits in commission, while avoiding the stifling restrictions that traditional portraiture can present.

Awards and exhibitions

 In 1983 he had his first solo-exhibition in Museum Het Kritzraedthuis in his hometown Sittard. Later that year he got a solo-exhibition in Museum Aemstelle in Amstelveen. In 1986 he participated in the exhibition Contemporary Portraiture in the Netherlands in The Singer Museum in Laren. Later, he painted portraits of Egbert van Paridon (founder of the theater company Centrum) and Dutch actors Nelly Frijda and Antonie Kamerling.
 In 1990, he saw his first painting on show in the Henoch Gallery in SoHo, a self-portrait.
 In 1995 Heldens participated in the exhibition ‘Representation Represented’ in the Arnot Art Museum in Elmira (NY) together with Janet Fish, Gregory Gillespie, Paul Cadmus, Claudio Bravo and Michael Leonard, where Heldens’ contribution drew much attention.
 Heldens won the Menena Joy Schwabe Award, held in The Mall Galleries in London in 1998.
 In 2011 Heldens' painting “Distracted” won the BP Portrait Award in the National Portrait Gallery in London.

Sources
Wim Heldens' site
GoFigurative site of Heldens
Gibbons, E. (2011). 100 Artists of the Male Figure: A Contemporary Anthology of Painting, Drawing, and Sculpture. Shiffer Publishing, Atglen, PA. 244 pages. 
De Wereld Draait Door episode about Wim Heldens (Dutch)
Seesle account of Heldens

References

1954 births
Living people
20th-century Dutch painters
Dutch male painters
21st-century Dutch painters
People from Sittard
20th-century Dutch male artists